Mario Ricci (13 August 1914 – 22 February 2005) was an Italian cyclist. He rode in seven editions of the Giro d'Italia, and the 1949 Tour de France. Ricci also won the Giro di Lombardia in 1941 and 1945.

References

External links

1914 births
2005 deaths
Italian male cyclists
Sportspeople from Padua
Cyclists from the Province of Padua